The 2015–16 season is a season played by Anderlecht, a Belgian football club based in Anderlecht, Brussels. The season covers the period from 1 July 2015 to 30 June 2016. Anderlecht will be participating in the Belgian Pro League, Belgian Cup and the UEFA Europa League.

Match details
League positions are sourced by Statto, while the remaining information is referenced individually.

Belgian Pro League

Regular season

Championship play-offs

Belgian Cup

UEFA Europa League

Group stage

Knockout stage

Appearances and goals
Source:
Numbers in parentheses denote appearances as substitute.
Players with names struck through and marked  left the club during the playing season.
Players with names in italics and marked * were on loan from another club for the whole of their season with Anderlecht.
Players listed with no appearances have been in the matchday squad but only as unused substitutes.
Key to positions: GK – Goalkeeper; DF – Defender; MF – Midfielder; FW – Forward

References

Anderlecht
R.S.C. Anderlecht seasons
Anderlecht